Timothy Simon Roth (born 14 May 1961) is an English actor and producer. He began acting on films and television series in the 1980s. He was among a group of prominent British actors of the era, the "Brit Pack". 

He made his television debut in Made in Britain (1982), and his film debut in The Hit (1984), for which he was nominated for the BAFTA Award for Most Promising Newcomer. Since then, he gained more attention for his roles in films, including The Cook, the Thief, His Wife & Her Lover, (1989), Vincent & Theo (1990), and Rosencrantz & Guildenstern Are Dead (1990). Roth collaborated with Quentin Tarantino on several films, such as Reservoir Dogs (1992), Pulp Fiction (1994), Four Rooms (1995) and The Hateful Eight (2015). For his performance in Rob Roy (1995), Roth won the BAFTA Award for Best Actor in a Supporting Role, and was nominated for a Golden Globe Award for Best Supporting Actor – Motion Picture and the Academy Award for Best Supporting Actor. 

Roth made his directorial debut with the film The War Zone (1999). He played Cal Lightman in the Fox series Lie to Me (2009–2011) and Jim Worth / Jack Devlin in the Sky Atlantic series Tin Star (2017–2020). Roth also portrayed Emil Blonsky / Abomination in the Marvel Cinematic Universe film The Incredible Hulk (2008), reprising the role in Shang-Chi and the Legend of the Ten Rings (2021) and the Disney+ series She-Hulk: Attorney at Law (2022).

Early life
Roth was born in Dulwich, London, the son of Ann, a painter and teacher, and Ernie, a Fleet Street journalist and painter. His father was born in Sheepshead Bay, Brooklyn, to a family of Irish descent. Although he was not of Jewish background, his father changed his surname from "Smith" to the German/Yiddish "Roth" in the 1940s, as "an act of anti-Nazi solidarity".

Roth is a survivor of child sexual abuse, committed by his paternal grandfather, who he has stated sexually abused him from childhood until his early teen years. He first revealed that he was a victim of sexual abuse during press for his 1999 directorial debut, The War Zone, a film which dealt with the topics of incest and sexual violence within a family, but declined to name the perpetrator at that time. In December 2016, he gave an interview to The Guardian in which he revealed that his abuser was his grandfather, who had also abused his father when he was a child.

Roth attended school in Lambeth, before moving to Croydon Technical School due to bullying. He attended the Strand School in Tulse Hill. As a young man, he wanted to be a sculptor and studied at London's Camberwell College of Arts.

Career

Roth starred in the television films in the 1980s, including Made in Britain, Meantime and Murder with Mirrors. After his film debut The Hit, he earned an Evening Standard Award for Most Promising Newcomer. He played an East End character in King of the Ghetto, a controversial drama based on a novel by Farukh Dhondy set in Brick Lane and broadcast by the BBC in 1986. In 1990, he played Vincent van Gogh in Vincent & Theo, and Guildenstern in Rosencrantz & Guildenstern Are Dead. During the late 1980s, Roth, Gary Oldman, Colin Firth, Daniel Day-Lewis, Bruce Payne and Paul McGann were dubbed the Brit Pack.

Roth collaborated with Quentin Tarantino on several films, including Reservoir Dogs, Pulp Fiction and Four Rooms. He played Archibald Cunningham in Rob Roy. He won the BAFTA Award for Best Actor in a Supporting Role, and was nominated for an Academy Award for Best Supporting Actor and a Golden Globe. In 1996, he starred in Woody Allen's musical film Everyone Says I Love You. He played "Danny Boodman T.D. Lemon 1900" in The Legend of 1900, and co-starred in the film Gridlock'd. He made his directorial debut film The War Zone, a film version of Alexander Stuart's novel. In 2001, he played General Thade the evil chimpanzee in Tim Burton’s Planet of the Apes. For the Harry Potter film series, Roth declined the role of Severus Snape, which went to Alan Rickman.

Roth starred in Francis Ford Coppola's film Youth Without Youth, Michael Haneke's Funny Games, and played Emil Blonsky / Abomination, a Russian-born officer in the British Royal Marines Commandos, in The Incredible Hulk. Hulk director Louis Leterrier was a fan of Roth's work, with the director telling Empire magazine, "it's great watching a normal Cockney boy become a superhero!". From 2009 to 2011, he starred in Lie To Me as Cal Lightman, an expert on body language who assists local and federal law organizations about the crime. A fan of Monty Python since his youth, in 2009 he appeared in the television documentary, Monty Python: Almost the Truth (Lawyers Cut). Roth appeared on the cover of Manic Street Preachers' 2010 studio album, Postcards from a Young Man.

In 2012, he was announced as the President of the Jury for the Un Certain Regard section at the 2012 Cannes Film Festival. He starred as FIFA President Sepp Blatter in United Passions, a film about football's governing body, released in 2014, to coincide with FIFA's 110th anniversary, and the 2014 FIFA World Cup. Roth starred in the film Chronic which had a limited release in 2016. He received an Independent Spirit Award for Best Male Lead nomination. Roth played Oswaldo Mobray in the ensemble western film The Hateful Eight. In 2019, Roth played a butler in a deleted scene for the film Once Upon a Time in Hollywood. He reprised his role as Emil Blonsky/Abomination in the film Shang-Chi and the Legend of the Ten Rings, and in the Disney+ series She-Hulk: Attorney at Law (2022), both set in the Marvel Cinematic Universe.

Personal life 
Roth's son Jack, born to Lori Baker in 1984, is also an actor. Roth married Nikki Butler in 1993. They had two sons, Hunter and Cormac. Cormac, a musician, died aged 25 from germ cell cancer on 16 October 2022.

Politics
Roth is a supporter of the Green Party of England and Wales. 

He endorsed Senator Bernie Sanders for President in the 2016 US presidential election. Roth was critical of Donald Trump’s victory saying “I hate Trump. I hate everything that he stands for. He should never be forgotten or forgiven for anything he said on the road to the White House".

Filmography

References

External links

 
 
 
 
 
 Tim Roth at www.lietome.com
 The Officially Unofficial Tim Roth Web Page
 Audio Interview w/ Rafferty/Mills Connection Podcast (2009)

1961 births
Living people
20th-century English male actors
21st-century English male actors
Alumni of Camberwell College of Arts
Best Supporting Actor BAFTA Award winners
British expatriate male actors in the United States
Child sexual abuse in England
English expatriates in the United States
English male film actors
English male stage actors
English people of American descent
English people of Irish descent
European Film Awards winners (people)
Film directors from London
Male actors from London
People educated at the Strand School
People from Dulwich